Elachista camilla is a moth of the family Elachistidae. It is found in Russia (the Altai Mountains).

The length of the forewings is 3.8–5 mm. The forewing costa is narrowly dark grey basally, the ground colour consisting of pale grey and darker grey tipped scales. The hindwings are grey with concolorous fringe scales.

References

camilla
Moths described in 2007
Endemic fauna of Altai
Moths of Asia